Sir Peter Robert Cable Lloyd (born 12 November 1937) is a retired English Conservative Party politician.

Parliamentary career
Lloyd was educated at Tonbridge School and Pembroke College, Cambridge, and was formerly a marketing manager for United Biscuits.

He stood for the Nottingham West constituency in the February and October 1974 elections, being beaten by Labour's Michael English.

Lloyd was Member of Parliament for Fareham in the south of England from 1979 to 2001, when he retired and was succeeded by Mark Hoban.

His previous positions include: Minister of state, Home Office (1992–1994), Parliamentary Under Secretary of State, Home Office (1989–1992), Parliamentary Under-Secretary of State, Department of Social Security (1988–1989), Government whip (1984–1988), PPS to Sir Keith Joseph (1983–1984), PPS to Adam Butler (1981–1982)

Lloyd served on, amongst others, the Treasury Select Committee in the late 1990s.

After Parliament
Lloyd is currently on the board of trustees for New Bridge an organisation founded in 1956 which aims to help prisoners stay in touch with society and later integrate back into it. He is also the President of the National Council for Independent Monitoring Boards, leading the monitoring of prisons and Immigration Removal Centres across England and Wales.

References

1937 births
Living people
Conservative Party (UK) MPs for English constituencies
UK MPs 1979–1983
UK MPs 1983–1987
UK MPs 1987–1992
UK MPs 1992–1997
UK MPs 1997–2001
People educated at Tonbridge School
Alumni of Pembroke College, Cambridge
Members of the Privy Council of the United Kingdom
Members of the Bow Group
Knights Bachelor
Politicians awarded knighthoods